Max Burckhard (14 July 1854, Korneuburg, Lower Austria - 16 March 1912, Vienna) was director of the Burgtheater, Vienna, from 1890 to 1898.

Vita 
Max Burckhard, a lawyer, was the artistic director of the Burgtheater when it opened as the “Neue Haus am Ring” on 12 May 1890. He remained director until 1898. He introduced Sunday matinees at a reduced cost to widen the theatre's potential audience. He later remarked that the less wealthy audiences were the most "critically acute". As director, he remodeled the auditorium in the spring and summer of 1897, and introduced contemporary drama by Henrik Ibsen, Gerhart Hauptmann, Arthur Schnitzler, Hugo von Hofmannsthal to the Viennese audience as well as Austrian classics of Ludwig Anzengruber and Ferdinand Raimund. He hired such famous actors as Adele Sandrock, Otto Treßler, Hedwig Bleibtreu, and Josef Kainz but was pressured to resign after having "aroused the displeasure of the Christian Social Party".

External links
Profile, oxfordreference.com; accessed 31 August 2016. 
 Profile, accessed 31 August 2016. 

1854 births
1912 deaths
People from Korneuburg
Austrian theatre directors